The Neogothic chapel in Mošovce, Slovakia was constructed in 1911 by Count Ferenc Révay as a mausoleum. The upper part of this neogothic building was used as a chapel and the lower as a crypt. Its exterior features a wide range of neogothic components. The interior presently hosts the Museum of Mošovce Crafts. Its exhibition includes tools used in the manufacture of well-known Mošovce products. The chapel is situated in the west corner of a park, which was also established by Count Révay. Rarities in the park include the exotic chestnut and ginkgo trees.

See also 
 Manor House in Mošovce
 Church of Holy Trinity in Mošovce
 Mošovce Park

References

External links 
 Official site 
Tourist Brochure
 Information about Mošovce
 Drienok

Chapels in Slovakia
Mošovce
Buildings and structures in Žilina Region